Nicoteles of Cyrene (c. 250 BC) was a Greek mathematician from Cyrene.

He is mentioned in the preface to Book IV of the Conics of Apollonius, as criticising Conon concerning the maximum number of points with which a conic section can meet another conic section. Apollonius states that Nicoteles claimed that the case in which a conic section meets opposite sections could be solved, but had not demonstrated how.

It is possible that Nicoteles could be a misspelling of Nicomedes.

References 
 Fried, M., Unguru, S., Apollonius of Perga's Conica: Text, Context, Subtext, Pages 120, 416–417. BRILL. (2001). 
 Heath, T., The Works of Archimedes, Pages 189–190. (1897). 
 Fuentes González, P. P., Nicotélès de Cyrène, in R. Goulet (ed.), Dictionnaire des Philosophes Antiques, vol. IV, Paris, CNRS, 2005, p. 702-703. 

Ancient Greek mathematicians
3rd-century BC Greek people
3rd-century BC mathematicians
People from Cyrenaica